Orangi  is a municipality approximately  in an area that forms much of the northwestern part of Karachi, Pakistan. When grouped with the neighboring municipality of Baldia Town, the Orangi-Baldia population is estimated to be over two million.

Orangi is the world's largest slum, with a population of 2.4 million, twice that of Mexico's Ciudad Neza, Mexico City (1.2 million) and more than twice that of India's Dharavi, Mumbai (1 million). While Orangi is the largest of Karachi's mostly unplanned settlement, much of Orangi does receive municipal services.

History 
Following the Partition of India and creation of the Islamic Republic of Pakistan, a separate country for Muslims of India in 1947, a large influx of Muslim refugees from India began moving into Karachi. The Pakistani government began granting permission for refugees to settle on vacant land by 1950. Orangi was established as a township in this context by 1965. The township was planned and developed with informal assistance from the city's municipal administration.

Its population rapidly increased in 1971 following the arrival of thousands of refugees fleeing from the newly independent state of Bangladesh, and the government began to regard it as a quasi-permanent settlement. However, due to its status as an unofficial and unplanned settlement, Orangi did not qualify for government aid or community assistance, and the area's sanitation was extremely poor. Unofficial administrators emerged and became members and leaders of local political parties.

In the 1980s, as local inhabitants became frustrated at the lack of assistance from the municipal administration, the Orangi Pilot Project was launched under the guidance of Akhtar Hameed Khan, in which the local community financed, designed and built their own low-cost sewerage system. As a result of the sense of ownership, the community maintained the sewerage system and streets itself. Piped water was only introduced to the settlement in 1984, though the Karachi Water and Sewerage Board eventually began providing water supply to the settlement.

Until the early 1980s, most of Orangi's population was Muhajir or Punjabi. The town's demography began to shift in the 1980s as Pashtuns began arriving in the city in large numbers. In 1985, Karachi's ethnic divisions reached Orangi, as Muhajir and Pashtun groups fought over the area near Benaras Chowk and Metro Cinema. In December 1986, Pashtun gunmen attacked the Aligarh Colony, which was home to a vulnerable population of Biharis who had recently been repatriated from Bangladesh.

The municipality was described in a 1999 National Geographic article on Mumbai's Dharavi slum as the "largest shanty town in Asia." Orangi is in fact a lower-class settlement with basic amenities of life available to most of the people. Only some parts of Orangi Town can be characterized as a slum. At  in size, it is "significantly less dense than most urban slums and also more structured". Ninety percent of Orangi's streets are connected to sewage services. Ninety-six percent of homes in Orangi have their own private latrine or toilet. Most homes in Orangi feature two or three rooms.

In 2001, Orangi was formally organized and established as a proper part of the city of Karachi and granted its own town council. By 2004, over 90% of households in Orangi were connected to the city's electric grid, although up to 20% of connections were illegal.

Geography 
Orangi is bordered by New Karachi to the north across the Shahrah-e-Zahid Hussain, Gulberg Town to the east across the Gujjar Nala stream, Liaquatabad Town to the south, and Sindh Industrial and Trading Estate to the west. There are 13 official neighborhoods, each with its own council, which has allowed the township to build its own sewer system.

The Khasba Hills forms a natural boundary between Orangi Town and North Nazimabad. The defunct City District Government constructed a road through the Khasba Hills connecting Orangi with North Nazimabad.

Demography 
Orangi's population alone is estimated to be over one million. When combined with neighboring Baldia, the population is over two million. Twenty-five percent of Orangi's population is Pashtuns, and another 25% Muhajir. A significant population of Muhajirs are Biharis who migrated from Bihar in 1947, and from East Pakistan in 1971. The remaining 50% is a mix of Afghans, Balochis, Bengalis, Punjabis, and Sindhis.

Orangi Pilot Project 

A Poverty-Alleviation project, called the Orangi Pilot Project, was initiated by Akhtar Hameed Khan in 1980. The project was aimed at socioeconomic development of Orangi. The project comprises a number of programs, including a people's financed and managed low-cost sanitation program, a housing program that assisted in the construction of 93,000 houses, a basic health and family planning program, and a rural development program in the nearby villages. The OPP also helps provide education services, and as a result, the literacy rate in Orangi is higher than the rate in Karachi overall. Along with the Orangi Charitable Trust (OCT), OPP operates a program of supervised credit for small family enterprise units.

The OPP sewer pipes are financed, constructed, and maintained by the families who live on each street, though one-eighth of the cost of services is provided by the municipal government. Pipes are built under the street, with each household contributing $800 to $1000 toward construction of sewer services. "Lane managers" collect dues from households, and arbitrate disputes. The OPP model has been exported to other cities in Sindh and Punjab. OPP has also helped establish Awami tanks,  which are underground water cisterns for use in a local area. Many are located under Orangi's mosques and churches.

Localities within Orangi 

 Baloch Goth
Bilal Colony
Chisti Nagar
Raees Amrohi Colony
Data Nagar
Ghabool Town
Ghaziabad
Hanifabad
Haryana Colony
Iqbal Baloch Colony
Madina Colony
Mohammad Nagar
Mominabad
Mujahidabad

See also 

 Akhtar Hameed Khan
 City District Government Karachi
 Khasa Hills
 Orangi Charitable Trust
 Orangi Nala
 Orangi Pilot Project

References

External links 

 Orangi Website

Slums in Asia
Shanty towns in Asia
Karachi
Squatting in Pakistan